Comecayo is a Salvadoran town located in the municipality of Santa Ana, El Salvador.

Division 
Comecayo is divided into 10 suburbs:
 Comecayo
 Los Aparejos
 Cruz Verde
 Puerto Rico
 Colonia Áviles
 Las Violetas
 El Jurón
 Colonia Méndez
 Colonia Bolaños
 El Sitio

Education 
Its educational institutions include:
 Complejo Educativo "Manuel Monedero"
 Liceo Cristiano Reverendo Juan Bueno del Cantón Comecayo

Populated places in El Salvador
Santa Ana Department